Shanghai Subdistrict is a subdistrict in Taijiang District, Fuzhou, Fujian province, China. , it has 7 residential communities under its administration:
Mudan Community
Shanghaixinyuan Community
Heshang Community
Fenghuang Community
Xiyang Community
Jiaotong Community
Wanxiang Community

See also 
 List of township-level divisions of Fujian

References 

Township-level divisions of Fujian
Fuzhou